Triflumuron is the active ingredient in some IGRs (insect growth regulators). An aromatic ether, organofluorine compound from the benzoylurea class and member of monochlorobenzenes.

References 

Insecticides
Ureas
Trifluoromethyl ethers